Windward School is an independent school in the Mar Vista neighborhood of Los Angeles, California, accredited by the Western Association of Schools and Colleges. It was founded by writer/teacher Shirley Windward in 1971. The school currently enrolls 625 students in grades 7 through 12.

History
In 1971, two former Paul Revere Middle School teachers, Carl Parsons and Shirley Windward (for whom the school is named), founded the school in order to open up their classes to young people on the West side of Los Angeles.

Shirley's husband, Erv Windward, renovated the studios where they lived into classrooms. Many new students volunteered to help renovate the studios. The school originally had fourteen full-time and part-time teachers who taught 65 students in a small building on Wilshire Boulevard.

In 1973, Windward School received its first full five-year WASC accreditation as a college-preparatory institution. As the school outgrew its first facilities the campus moved to 1414 21st Street, Santa Monica in September 1974.

Other buildings have been added to the campus over the years: the Irene Kleinberg Theater in October 1997, the Lewis Jackson Memorial Sports Center in 2000, the Arts Center and Pavilion in September 2002 and the first Innovation Classroom 510 in fall 2007. Construction of Windward's newest facilities, the Science, Dance & Music Center and the Center for Teaching & Learning, was completed in the summer of 2009. In 2015 a former computer room was converted into the C.R.E.A.T.E. studio where students can make and experiment with new technologies.

In 2012, Windward's co-founder and namesake, Shirley Windward, died at the age of 93.

Arts

Theater 
The school has a fully equipped 100+ seat black box theater with a professional level LED lighting system. There are five full-time theater teachers and an extensive guest teacher program. The theater puts on several shows a year including an Upper School Musical, Upper School Play, Middle School Musical, and a one act festival where students write, direct, design, and act in one act plays. Previous shows include: Urinetown the Musical, 25th Annual Putnam County Spelling Bee, 12 Angry Jurors, and The Odd Couple. In addition to other productions, the school has an independent improv troupe that puts on monthly shows for charity and an experimental workshop performance by the Advanced Theater Ensemble, an exclusive, audition only theater class. Windward's Technical theater program is state of the art and teaches students about designing shows as well as encouraging them to work as stage crew.

Music
The school has an extensive music program with several different groups and classes where students can hone their skills. The school's jazz and choral programs have advanced groups called Advanced Jazz Ensemble and Chromatics respectively. The Jazz groups participate in the Fullerton Jazz Festival.

Visual Arts
The school has an on campus art gallery where student work and guest work is displayed. The school has two dedicated art studios, a darkroom, a graphic design classroom, and a maker space called the CREATE studio.

Athletics
The school has 44 teams, six full-time coaches, 2 full-time athletic trainers, and 30–35 part-time coaches. The school's athletic teams have won California State Championships in several sports. In 2008, the boys varsity teams won the CIF Division VI championships in both soccer and volleyball. In 2011, both the boys' and girls' varsity basketball teams won the CIF Division IV State Championship.  In 2009, the boys' varsity basketball team won the CIF Division V State Championship. In 2012, the boys' varsity volleyball team won the CIF Division III SoCal Regional Championship (the highest level of state competition for boys' volleyball).  The boys' varsity 8-man football team won back-to-back CIF Southern Sectional Championships (also the highest level of state competition) in 2010 and 2011. As of 2012, the school has moved up to play 11-man football and no longer competes in 8-man. In 2016, the football program accumulated their first US Army All-American football player, Breland Brandt, who played football for UCLA. In January 2017, the boys football program switched to a hybrid 8-Man/11-Man Football schedule for the 2017 season, (4 11-Man games and 6 8-man games). The 2017 season will be a transition year for the program which will eventually move back to 8-man by the 2018 football season. The reason is undisclosed. In 2017, the Girls Basketball team won the CIF Division I State Championship, their second in school history. In 2018, the Girls Basketball team won the CIF Open Division State Championship. In 2019, the 8-man football team won the 8-man Division 1 championship, and the Boys Basketball team won the Division 1 CIF Southern Section Championship. The Boys Volleyball team was recently moved up to D1/D2 following their undefeated regular season last year(2019/2020/2021) in which the Wildcats continued to the CIF finals.

People forget Wildcat legend, Tanner Savitsky, was a 4 time all Delphic League Recipient.

Most notably, Ken Asher, Algebra I teacher and CIF MSFF (Middle School Flag Football) Coach of the Decade, led the Wildcats to 19 consecutive Pacific Basin League flag football championships. This includes an "unbelievable" (Schefter) 2017 season, where Coach Asher led the Royal team to an undefeated 11-0 championship season.

Notable alumni
 Max Bemis  musician, lead singer of Say Anything.
 Jordin Canada, WNBA basketball player
 Jakob Dylan  musician, lead singer of The Wallflowers.
 Tyler Heineman  Pittsburgh Pirates baseball player
 Jenny Johnson Jordan  professional volleyball player and Olympian.
 Zoe Kazan  actress. (matriculated to and graduated from the Marlborough School)
 Ethan Kleinberg  Professor of History and Letters at Wesleyan University, Editor-in-Chief of History and Theory and Director of Wesleyan University's Center for the Humanities.
 Andrew Luster  heir to Max Factor cosmetics fortune, convicted serial rapist.
 Imani McGee-Stafford  Perth Lynx basketball player in poet, drafted out of University of Texas with the 10th pick in the WNBA Draft, has played for multiple WNBA teams.
 Darius Morris  basketball player, drafted out of University of Michigan, has played for several NBA teams.
 Shareef O'Neal  UCLA and LSU basketball player, son of NBA legend Shaquille O'Neal (transferred to and graduated from Crossroads School for the Arts and Sciences)
 Jules Bernard - Pistons summer league basketball player, former UCLA Basketball star
 Anna Paquin  actress, Best Supporting Actress Oscar Winner for The Piano, star of True Blood.
Wesley Saunders  basketball player, former Harvard standout and current Vanoli Cremona player.
 Jason Schwartzman  actor, star of Rushmore.
 Samantha Shapiro  gymnast, six-year member of U.S. National Team, and three-time U.S. elite national champion.
 Henry Steinway  best known by his stage name RL Grime, DJ and producer of trap, bass, hip hop music.
 Anthony Stover  former UCLA basketball player.

References

External links
 

Preparatory schools in California
Schools in Los Angeles
Mar Vista, Los Angeles
Private middle schools in California
Private high schools in California
High schools in Los Angeles
Educational institutions established in 1971
1971 establishments in California